Lucy Myers Wright Mitchell (née Lucy Myers Wright; March 20, 1845 – March 10, 1888) was an American classical archaeologist, historian, and missionary who studied ancient art. Mitchell was the first American to publish a book on classical sculpture and was one of the first women to study the field of classical archaeology.

Mitchell was born in Urumiah, Persia, to Catherine Myers Wright and Austin Hazen Wright, a Nestorian Christian missionary and Dartmouth College alumnus. She is the sister of classical scholar John Henry Wright. Mitchell attended Mount Holyoke Female Seminary (now Mount Holyoke College) and left in 1864 with no degree when she was chosen to accompany her father on his return to his mission in Persia. After his death in 1865, she left missionary life. She married Samuel S. Mitchell, who studied language and art, in 1867, and they would live in Lebanon and Germany before returning to Massachusetts. Her two-volume, 766 page work, A History of Ancient Sculpture, begins with its origins in Ancient Egypt in the first volume, and includes Selections of Ancient Sculpture, a second volume of plates.  Classical archaeologist Stephen L. Dyson calls Mitchell’s work "the first general American text on ancient art".

Bibliography
A History of Ancient Sculpture (1883) Download. View
Selections of Ancient Sculpture (1883)

See also 
 Ersilia Caetani-Lovatelli

References

External links

 Collection: Wright Family papers, Dartmouth Library Archives & Manuscripts.
 Teng, Wen Li. (2020). "Grant Park and the Globe: Lucy Mitchell, Bessie Bennett, and the Art Institute of Chicago." The Virginia Tech Undergraduate Historical Review. 9: pp. 17–27. 

1845 births
1888 deaths
American classical scholars
Women classical scholars
American art educators
Mount Holyoke College alumni
People from Urmia
American women archaeologists
American expatriates in Iran
19th-century American women writers
Classical archaeologists
Art Institute of Chicago
People from Marion, Massachusetts